Sir Edwin Sandys ( – 15 March 1608) was an English politician, MP for Andover 1586–1587.

He was the eldest son of Miles Sandys  (brother of Edwin Sandys, Archbishop of York) and his first wife Hester Clifton.

Sandys and his brothers may be the "Sandes" who appear in the registers of Eton College, in which case Edwin Sandys attended 1574–1575. He entered the Middle Temple in 1579.

On 2 June 1586 he married Elizabeth Sandys, daughter of William, 3rd Baron Sandys of The Vyne. (Despite the name, the two families had different origins: the family of Archbishop Sandys originated in Cumbria, while the Barons Sandys had their seat at The Vyne, Hampshire.) They had three sons, of which the youngest, but the only one to leave children, was Colonel Henry Sandys, 5th Baron Sandys.

Sandys was elected MP for Andover in 1586, but sat in only one Parliament. In the following Parliament of 1589, Sandys was replaced by his brother-in-law Thomas Temple.

He was knighted in Ireland in 1599, and was High Sheriff of Bedfordshire from February to November 1606.

He died on 15 March 1608.

References

1560s births
1608 deaths
People educated at Eton College
Members of the Middle Temple
English MPs 1586–1587